The Dr. Wesley Bowers House is a historic house located at Southampton in Suffolk County, New York.

Description and history 
It is a large, rambling oceanside mansion built in 1930 in the Spanish Colonial Revival style.

It was added to the National Register of Historic Places on October 2, 1986.

References

Houses on the National Register of Historic Places in New York (state)
Houses completed in 1930
Southampton (village), New York
Spanish Colonial Revival architecture in New York (state)
Houses in Suffolk County, New York
National Register of Historic Places in Suffolk County, New York